Bibelot Almendra Mansur Rodríguez (born March 31, 1978) is a Mexican actress, born in Orizaba, Veracruz, Mexico.

Mansur is best known for her most-recent roles in Destilando Amor (2007) as "Acacia", Querida Enemiga (2008) as "Rossy", and Zacatillo, un lugar en tu corazón (2010) as "Gudelia".

Filmography
Me declaro culpable (2017–2018)...Celia
La vecina (2015)...Magda
Como dice el dicho (2012–2013)...Rosana / Leonor 
Amorcito Corazón (2011)...Yazmín
Zacatillo, un lugar en tu corazón (2010)... Gudelia
Querida Enemiga (2008) ... Rosalbina "Rossy" López Martínez
Destilando Amor (2007) ... Acacia
La Verdad Oculta (2006) ... Mina
Corazones al límite (2004) ... Patty
Amarte es mi pecado (2004) ... Pascuala Ocampo
Niña Amada Mía (2003) ... Choffy
Amigas y Rivales (2001) ... Estefanny
Locura de Amor (2000) ... Rubí
Rivales a Muerte (2000) ... Melina
Por tu Amor (1999) ... Mercedes
Tres mujeres (1999) ... Gina

External links

1978 births
Living people
Mexican telenovela actresses
Actresses from Veracruz
People from Orizaba